The Slovenian Red Cross is a non-government and non-profit humanitarian organisation, part of the International Red Cross and Red Crescent Movement. It was established in Gradac in June 1944, at first as part of the Yugoslav Red Cross. It became an independent entity after the Slovenian proclamation of independence in 1991. It has its headquarters in Ljubljana, Slovenia.

References

External links

Slovenian Red Cross homepage

Red Cross and Red Crescent national societies
1944 establishments in Slovenia
Red Cross
Organizations based in Ljubljana
Non-profit organizations based in Slovenia
Organizations established in 1944